Pietro Martire Giustiniani, O.P. (1645–1715) was a Roman Catholic prelate who served as Archbishop (Personal Title) of Tinos (1700–1715) and Archbishop of Naxos (1691–1700).

Biography
Pietro Martire Giustiniani was born in Chios, Greece in 1645 and ordained a priest in the Order of Preachers.
On 10 December 1691, he was appointed during the papacy of Pope Innocent XII as Archbishop (Personal Title) of Tinos.
On 13 January 1692, he was consecrated bishop by Galeazzo Marescotti, Cardinal-Priest of Santi Quirico e Giulitta, with Giuseppe Bologna, Archbishop of Capua, and Stefano Giuseppe Menatti, Titular Bishop of Cyrene, serving as co-consecrators. 
On 10 May 1700, he was appointed during the papacy of Pope Innocent XII as Bishop of Tinos.
He served as Bishop of Tinos until his death in January 1715.

References

External links and additional sources
 (for Chronology of Bishops) 
 (for Chronology of Bishops) 
 (for Chronology of Bishops) 
 (for Chronology of Bishops) 

17th-century Roman Catholic archbishops in the Republic of Venice
18th-century Roman Catholic archbishops in the Republic of Venice
Bishops appointed by Pope Innocent XII
Clergy from Chios
1645 births
1715 deaths
Dominican bishops
Roman Catholic archbishops of Naxos